Gallozzi is an Italian surname. Notable people with the surname include:

Guillaume Gallozzi (1958–1995), French art dealer
Marco Gallozzi (born 1988), Italian footballer

See also
Galluzzi

Italian-language surnames